Carla Pérez (born 28 December 1982) is an Ecuadorian mountaineer, and mountain guide. In 2019 edge became the first woman to successfully summit both Everest and K2 in the same year (in 1995 Alison Hargreaves reached both summits unsupported and without supplemental oxygen but died descending K2), and the first woman from the Americas to summit K2 without supplemental oxygen.

Early life
When Pérez was four years old her father took her to a 14,000-foot volcano near their home at Quito, Ecuador, which inspired her to become a mountain climber.

Notable climbs

Manaslu 
In 2012, Pérez reached the summit of Manaslu without supplemental oxygen.

Cho Oyu 
In 2014, Pérez completed a solo ascent of Cho Oyu without supplemental oxygen.

Broad Peak 
In 2015, Pérez reached the summit of Broad Peak without supplemental oxygen.

Mount Everest 
Pérez has spent time on Mount Everest as both a mountain guide and a climber. In 2016, she became the first woman from Latin America to reach the summit without supplemental oxygen. In 2019, she successfully guided clients to the summit via the northeast ridge.

K2 
In 2019, Pérez became the first woman from the Americas to reach the summit of K2 without supplemental oxygen. In so doing, she became the second woman to reach the summit of Mount Everest and K2 in the same year. Alison Hargreaves being the first, in 1995 who climbed unsupported and without supplemental oxygen but tragically died in a storm during descent.

Dhaulagiri 
In 2021, Pérez climbed on Dhaulagiri but was not able to reach the summit.

Makalu 
In 2022, Pérez reached the summit of Makalu without supplemental oxygen.

References 

1982 births
Living people
Ecuadorian mountain climbers
Summiters of Mount Everest